The 1999 Investor Swedish Open was a men's tennis tournament played on outdoor clay courts in Båstad, Sweden that was part of the World Series of the 1999 ATP Tour. It was the 52nd edition of the tournament and was held from 5 July until 11 July 1999. Unseeded Juan Antonio Marín won the singles titles.

Finals

Singles

 Juan Antonio Marín defeated  Andreas Vinciguerra, 6–4, 7–6(7–4)
 It was Marín's only singles title of his career.

Doubles

 David Adams /  Jeff Tarango defeated  Nicklas Kulti /  Mikael Tillström, 7–6(8–6), 6–4

References

External links
 ITF tournament edition details

Rado Open
Swedish Open
Swedish Open
July 1999 sports events in Europe
Swed